Harilal Madhavjibhai Patel (born 7 January 1953) is an Indian politician from the state of Gujarat. He was a member of Lok Sabha of India, representing the Porbandar constituency of Gujarat from 1991 to 1996, and later in 14th Lok Sabha 2004 to 2009, both times for Bharatiya Janata Party. He contested from Dhoraji in 2012 mid-term assembly elections on BJP ticket but lost to Vitthal Radadiya of Congress. He contested by-poll in 2013 from the same seat, this time on Congress' ticket, but lost again to Pravin Makadiya of BJP.

External links
 Official biographical sketch in Parliament of India website

1953 births
People from Rajkot
Bharatiya Janata Party politicians from Gujarat
Living people
India MPs 1991–1996
India MPs 2004–2009